Charles Renaux (31 December 1884 – 17 October 1971) was a French footballer. He competed in the men's tournament at the 1908 Summer Olympics.

References

External links
 

1884 births
1971 deaths
French footballers
France international footballers
Olympic footballers of France
Footballers at the 1908 Summer Olympics
Sportspeople from Roubaix
Association football midfielders
RC Roubaix players
Footballers from Hauts-de-France